Asmoli is a legislative assembly constituency in the Sambhal district of Uttar Pradesh.

Member of Legislative Assembly

Election results

2022

2017

See also
 List of constituencies of the Uttar Pradesh Legislative Assembly
 Sambhal district

References

External links
 Official site of Legislature in Uttar Pradesh
 Uttar Pradesh Government website
 UP Assembly 
 

Assembly constituencies of Uttar Pradesh
Sambhal district